Fantastic Story in Tokyo Dome was a professional wrestling event co-produced by the New Japan Pro-Wrestling (NJPW) and World Championship Wrestling (WCW) promotions. The show took place on January 4, 1993 in Tokyo's Tokyo Dome. Officially, the show drew 63,500 spectators and $3,200,000 in ticket sales. This was the second year that the show was co-promoted by the American WCW promotion. The show featured 10 matches, including four matches that featured WCW wrestlers. Fantastic Story featured three title matches, including Jushin Thunder Liger defeating Último Dragón to win the IWGP Junior Heavyweight Championship. IWGP Heavyweight Champion The Great Muta defeating Masahiro Chono to win the NWA World Heavyweight Championship in a match where the IWGP title was also on the line. Finally the show featured an IWGP Tag Team Championship match between The Hell Raisers (Hawk Warrior and Power Warrior) and The Steiner Brothers (Rick Steiner and Scott Steiner) that ended without a definitive winner. The show was later shown on pay-per-view (PPV) in North America as WCW/New Japan Supershow III.

Production

Background
The January 4 Tokyo Dome Show is NJPW's biggest annual event and has been called "the largest professional wrestling show in the world outside of the United States" and the "Japanese equivalent to the Super Bowl".

Storylines
Fantastic Story in Tokyo Dome featured professional wrestling matches that involved different wrestlers from pre-existing scripted feuds and storylines. Wrestlers portrayed villains, heroes, or less distinguishable characters in scripted events that built tension and culminated in a wrestling match or series of matches.

Results

References

External links
NJPW.co.jp 

1993 in professional wrestling
1993 in Tokyo
Fantastic Story in Tokyo Dome
January 1993 events in Asia
World Championship Wrestling shows
Professional wrestling joint events